Kenya Mori (born Kenya Mori Ochoa on January 15, 1976, in Montevideo, Uruguay) is an Uruguayan-born Mexican actress. Mori studied acting in TV Azteca's Centro de Formación Actoral.

Filmography

References

External links

Kenya Mori  Official Site

1976 births
Living people
Mexican telenovela actresses
Mexican television actresses
Mexican film actresses
20th-century Mexican actresses
21st-century Mexican actresses
Actresses from Montevideo
Mexican people of Basque descent
Mexican people of Japanese descent
Mexican people of Lebanese descent
Mexican people of Uruguayan descent
Uruguayan people of Basque descent
Uruguayan people of Japanese descent
Uruguayan people of Mexican descent
Uruguayan people of Lebanese descent
People educated at Centro de Estudios y Formación Actoral
Naturalized citizens of Mexico
Uruguayan emigrants to Mexico
People from Montevideo
Actresses of Japanese descent